Milford Mill station is a Metro SubwayLink station in Lochearn, Maryland. It is the twelfth station on the line going outbound and the third going inbound, and has approximately 1300 parking spaces.

Station layout

Artwork
The Maryland Transit Administration commissioned artist Norman Kenneth Carlberg to create artwork for Milford Mill station. His abstract sculpture "Uno Y Dos," constructed from painted stainless steel, can be seen outside the station.

References

External links

Metro SubwayLink stations
Baltimore County, Maryland landmarks
Railway stations in the United States opened in 1987
Lochearn, Maryland
1987 establishments in Maryland
Railway stations in Baltimore County, Maryland